Fusarium oxysporum f.sp. lini is a fungal plant pathogen. Among the diseases it causes is flax wilt.

See also
 List of flax diseases

References

External links
 USDA ARS Fungal Database

oxysporum f.sp. lini
Fungi described in 1940
Fungal plant pathogens and diseases
Fiber plant diseases
Forma specialis taxa